Episodic dyscontrol syndrome (EDS), otherwise known as intermittent explosive disorder (IED) or sometimes just dyscontrol, is a pattern of abnormal, episodic, and frequently violent and uncontrollable social behavior in the absence of significant provocation; it can result from limbic system diseases, disorders of the temporal lobe, or abuse of alcohol or other psychoactive substances.

EDS is a clearly identified category in the Diagnostic and Statistical Manual of Mental Disorders (DSM IV). EDS may affect children or adults. Children are often considered to have epilepsy or a mental health problem. The episodes consist of recurrent attacks of uncontrollable rage, usually after minimal provocation, and may last up to an hour. Following an episode, children are frequently exhausted, may sleep and will usually have no recall.

Cause

Treatment 
Treatment for EDS usually involves treating the underlying causative factor(s).  This may involve psychotherapy, or medical treatment for diseases.

EDS has been successfully controlled in clinical trials using prescribed medications, including carbamazepine, ethosuximide, and propranolol.

There have been few randomised controlled trials of treatment of EDS/IED. Antidepressants and mood-stabilisers including lithium, sodium valproate and carbamazepine have been used in adults, and occasionally in children with oppositional defiant disorder or conduct disorder to reduce aggression. Cognitive behavioural therapy (CBT) is effective in the treatment of anger. A recent trial randomised adults with IED to 12 weeks of individual therapy, group therapy or waiting list (no therapy). Intervention resulted in an improvement in anger and aggression levels, with no difference between group and individual CBT (Cognitive behavioural therapy). Adolescents and young adults may experience educational and social consequences but also mental health problems, including parasuicide, if IED/EDS is undiagnosed in early childhood.

Legal implications 
A diagnosis of EDS has been used as a defense in court for persons accused of committing violent crimes including murder.

See also 
 Intermittent explosive disorder

References

External links 
 Dorland's Medical Dictionary

Syndromes
Mood disorders